The 2000 Winston 500 presented by UPS was a NASCAR Winston Cup Series racing event held on October 15, 2000, at Talladega Superspeedway in Talladega, Alabama. As one of the final five races of the 2000 NASCAR Winston Cup Series season, this event turned out to be the "event of the year" as the poetic final six laps of the race would allow Dale Earnhardt to secure an unlikely win during the twilight of his NASCAR Winston Cup career.

Individual race earnings ranged from the winner's share of $135,900 ($ when adjusted for inflation) to the last-place finisher's share of $44,086 ($). A grand total of $2,329,646 was awarded to all the qualifying drivers of this event ($). Earnhardt and a fan each won an extra $1 million as part of the Winston No Bull 5 program.

As of 2022, This is the most recent points race with none of Kurt Busch, Ryan Newman, or Kevin Harvick making the field.

Race report

Three different incidents resulted in yellow flags; a stalled vehicle near the start/finish line, debris on the race track, and a four-car accident on the tri-oval. 13 laps were run under a caution flag while the green flag lasted for an average of 44 laps. The first 104 laps proved to be the longest green-flag run. The next longest green lap stretch was from lap 120 to lap 168.

The 188-lap race lasted for three hours and one minute and became the first of only five races to run the roof spoiler package which temporarily dealt with the inconsistencies of restrictor-plate racing. Dale Earnhardt won the race, his second victory of the season and the 76th and final one in his career, beating Kenny Wallace by .119 seconds in front of about 170,000 fans. This race became only the second race in NASCAR history where half the field led.

The final six laps of the race were the definition of poetry as Earnhardt came from 18th place to first to win a feat that NASCAR fans continue to regard as a memorable moment. Kenny Wallace and Nemechek would play a role in Earnhardt's win by holding off most of the competition. Wallace has said that he did not try to pass Earnhardt because he did not recognize his teammate Nemechek car behind him, which had a special Charlie Daniels paint scheme. Four months later, Earnhardt would be killed in a crash in the 2001 Daytona 500.

All 43 drivers were born in the United States of America. Chevrolet and Ford vehicles made up 33 of the 43 positions on the starting grid. Chevrolet's sister makes Pontiac made up the remaining 10 positions. Wally Dallenbach Jr., Blaise Alexander, and Hut Stricklin failed to qualify for the race. Both Earnhardt and his son Dale Earnhardt Jr. participated in this event; the younger Earnhardt finished 14th. Kevin Lepage finished last as a result of problems with his ignition on lap 20. This was indisputably the most exciting race of the 2000 NASCAR Winston Cup Series season; with the last five laps being a power struggle between John Andretti, Mike Skinner, and eventual race winner Dale Earnhardt due to his mastery of the draft.

Dave Marcis went from starting in ninth place to leading the second lap. And they ran an extremely manic race with only one major crash happening on lap 169 involving four different drivers. A driver in the NASCAR Winston Cup Series during the early-2000s could gain five or six positions in a lap or lose fifteen in a restrictor-plate race. The race was televised by ESPN, with pit reporter Jerry Punch (filling in for regular ESPN broadcaster Bob Jenkins, who was at Texas Motor Speedway for the Excite 500 IRL race held that same day), Benny Parsons, and Ned Jarrett commentating. Punch's normal position on pit road was filled by Ray Dunlap.

The winning car has been restored and painted with the period-correct logos and Day-Glo numerals and spoilers, remaining with Richard Childress Racing and in the team's museum, and is often driven at historic events, most notably at the Goodwood Festival of Speed with other historic race cars of all motorsport.  During the 2019 1000Bulbs.com 500, was driven as a two-seater with Johnny Morris of sponsor Bass Pro Shops in the passenger seat as a pace lap.

Qualifying

Finishing order
Section reference:

Did Not Qualify
 Blaise Alexander (No. 91) - Ericsson Telecommunications
 Wally Dallenbach Jr. (No. 75) - WCW World Championship Wrestling/Red Cell Batteries
 Hut Stricklin (No. 90) - Hills Brothers Coffee

Post-race standings

References

Winston
Winston 500
Dale Earnhardt
NASCAR races at Talladega Superspeedway
October 2000 sports events in the United States